The 1967 season was the 62nd season of competitive football in Norway.

1. divisjon

2. divisjon

Group A

Group B

3. divisjon

Group Østland/Søndre

Group Øsland/Nordre

Group Sørland/Vestland, A

Group Sørland/Vestland, B

Group Sørland/Vestland, C

Group Møre

Group Trøndelag

District IX-X

District XI

Play-off Sørland/Vestland
Varegg - Vard 1-4
Flekkefjord - Varegg 1-2
Vard - Flekkefjord 7-2

Play-off Møre/Trøndelag
Aalesund - Falken 1-1
Falken - Aalesund 0-1 (agg. 1-2)

Aalesund promoted

Northern Norway Championship
Mjølner - Alta 11-0

4. divisjon

District I

District II, Group A

District II, Group B

District III, Group A (Oplandene)

District III, Group B1 (Sør-Østerdal)

District III, Group B2 (Nord-Østerdal)

District III, Group B3 (Sør-Gudbrandsdal)

District III, Group B4 (Nord-Gudbrandsdal)

District IV, Group A (Vestfold)

District IV, Group B (Telemark)

District V, Group A1 (Aust-Agder)

District V, Group A2 (Vest-Agder)

District V, Group B1 (Rogaland)

District V, Group B2 (Rogaland)

District V, Group B3 (Sunnhordland)

Table unknown

District VI, Group A (Bergen)

District VI, Group B (Midthordland)

District VI, Group C (Sogn og fjordane)

District VII, Group A (Sunnmøre)

District VII, Group B (Romsdal)

District VII, Group C (Nordmøre)

District VIII, Group A (Sør-Trøndelag)

District VIII, Group B (Trondheim)

District VIII, Group C (Fosen)

District VIII, Group D (Nord-Trøndelag/Namdal)

District IX

District X

District XI

Play-off District I/IV
Sparta - Stag 1-3
Stag - Brevik 4-2
Brevik - Sparta 2-0

Play-off District II/III
Nordre Trysil - Brekken 1-0
Sel - Faaberg 3-7
Faaberg - Nordre Trysil 0-3
Brumunddal - Drafn 0-3
Åssiden - Nordre Trysil 3-1
Drafn - Åssiden 2-0
Nordre Trysil - Brumunddal 1-1
Brumunddal - Åssiden 1-1
Drafn - Nordre Trysil 2-1

Championship District III
Brumunddal - Nordre Trysil 6-1

Play-off District V
Klepp - Stavanger 1-2
Stord - Klepp 2–4
Stavanger - Stord 2-2

Championship District V
Risør - Mandalskameratene 3-3
Mandalskameratene - Risør 3-1

Play-off District VI
Jotun - Arna 2-0
Arna - Sandviken 0-1
Sandviken - Jotun 4-0

Play-off District VII
Skarbøvik - Åndalsnes 1-6
Åndalsnes - Bøfjord 3-1
Bøfjord - Skarbøvik 0-3

Play-off District VIII
Neset - Strinda 1-1
Flå - Hasselvika 2-2
Strinda - Flå 0-1
Hasselvika - Neset 2-1
Strinda - Hasselvika 2-3
Flå - Neset 0-3

Norwegian Cup

Final

Northern Norwegian Cup

Final

European Cups 1967/68

Norwegian representatives
Skeid (UEFA Champions League)
Fredrikstad (Cup Winners Cup)
Lyn (Fairs Cup)

European Cup

First round
September 20:
Skeid - Sparta Prague (Czechoslovakia) 0-1

October 4
Sparta Prague - Skeid 1-1 (agg. 2-1)

European Cup Winners' Cup

First round
September 20
Fredrikstad - Setubal (Portugal) 1-5

October 5
Setubal - Fredrikstad 2-1 (agg. 7-2)

Fairs Cup

First round
September 19
Bologna (Italy) - Lyn 2-0

October 4
Lyn - Bologna 0-0 (agg. 0-2)

National team

 

Note: Norway's goals first 
Explanation:
ECQ = UEFA Euro 1968 qualifier

External links
 RSSSF Norway

     
Seasons in Norwegian football